Nana (Kushan Greek: Νανα, Ναναια, Ναναϸαο, Sogdian nny) was a Bactrian female divinity, a conflation of Sumero-Babylonian Inanna with a local divinity, in her Kushan form with the indigenous (Zoroastrian) Harahvati Aredvi Sura Anahita. Such syncretism was common among the Kushan deities.

Nana is first attested by name on a coin of Sapadbizes, a 1st-century BCE king of Bactria who preceded the Kushans. In this singular case, Nana is depicted as a lion. Nana then reappears two centuries later on the coins and seals of the Kushan kings, in particular of the mid-2nd century CE Kanishka I. The Rabatak inscription of Kanishka I invokes her as well. Her characteristics are martial in these depictions, and she was typically depicted as a seated martial goddess, escorted by a lion, which is almost similar to the Hindu goddess of war Durga, who rides on a lion and protects her devotees from evils.  She was also associated with fertility, wisdom and the waters (in particular of the Indus River, which was known as Harahuati in the Avesta and of which Harahuati Ardevi Sura Anahita was the patron). 

The Kushan territories encompassed the Iranian-language speaking regions of Sogdiana, Ferghana, Bactria and Arachosia, and the conquered Indian territory of Gandhara, and Mathura. Those provinces lie in the modern states of Afghanistan, Tajikistan, Uzbekistan and northwestern India. Depictions of Nana are known from Afghanistan as late as the 5th-6th century CE. In Afghanistan and Pakistan the name appears as "Nawi", the Pashto word for bride.

Gallery

References

Further reading
Azarpay, Guity. "Nana, the Sumero-Akkadian Goddess of Transoxiana." Journal of the American Oriental Society (1976): 536–542. 
Falk, Harry. "Kushan rule granted by Nana: The background of a heavenly legitimation." Kushan Histories: Literary Sources and Selected Papers from a Symposium at Berlin, December 5 to 7, 2013. Hempen Verlag, 2015.

Asian goddesses
Archaeology of Afghanistan
Inanna
Anahita
Bactria
Lion deities